The 2013 Formula 3 Sudamericana season was the twenty-seventh and final season of the Formula 3 Sudamericana. It begin on 7 April at Interlagos and ended on 1 December at Curitiba, after eighteen races. In 2014 the championship becomes a Brazilian Championship.

Drivers and teams
 All cars are powered by Berta engines, and run on Pirelli tyres.

Race calendar and results
A calendar for the 2013 season was released on 21 December 2012, with all Brazilian rounds supporting Brasileiro de Marcas events. A round in Argentina was also scheduled, with the venue later confirmed as the Autódromo Ciudad de Concordia, supporting the TC 2000 Championship.

Championship standings

References

External links
 The official website of the Formula 3 Sudamericana

Formula 3 Sudamericana
Sudamericana
Formula 3 Sudamericana seasons
Sudamericana F3